Ilyana Kuziemko is a professor of economics at Princeton University, where she has taught since 2014. She previously served as the David W. Zalaznick Associate Professor of Business at Columbia Business School from July 2013 to June 2014 and as associate professor from July 2012 to June 2013. From 2007 to 2012, she was an assistant professor of economics and public affairs at Princeton University and Woodrow Wilson School. She also served as a Deputy Assistant Secretary for Economic Policy at the U.S. Department of the Treasury from 2009–2010 under The Office of Microeconomic Analysis. During her tenure, she worked primarily on the development and early implementation of the Affordable Care Act.

Education 
Ilyana Kuziemko obtained an A.B. in economics from Harvard University, where she graduated summa cum laude in 2000. After being selected as a Rhodes scholar, she studied at Oxford University from 2000–2002 where she obtained a B.A. in mathematics. She went on to pursue a Ph.D. in economics from Harvard University, where she graduated in 2007.

Occupation and affiliations 

 Professor of Economics, Princeton University
 Co-director, Center for Health and Well-being, Woodrow Wilson School, Princeton University
 Research associate, National Bureau of Economic Research
 Co-editor, American Economic Journal: Applied Economics
 Associate editor, Journal of Economic Literature

Previous positions 

 July 2013 – June 2014: David W. Zalaznick Associate Professor of Business, Columbia Business School
 July 2012 – June 2013: Associate professor, Columbia Business School
 June 2009 – May 2010: Deputy Assistant Secretary for Economic Policy, U.S. Department of the Treasury
 July 2007 – June 2012: Assistant professor of economics and public affairs, Woodrow Wilson School, Princeton University
 January 2014 – March 2016: Associate editor, Journal of the European Economic Association

Research 
Ilyana Kuziemko's research primarily focuses on economic inequality. Her research interests include:

 Voter preferences regarding redistributive policies
 The implications of U.S. public health insurance programs on vulnerable groups
 The U.S. criminal justice system

Selected publications

Research on voter preferences regarding redistributive policies 
Support for Redistribution in an Age of Rising Inequality: New Stylized Facts and Some Tentative Explanations (2016)

To determine the changes in level of support for redistribution in the U.S., Ilyana Kuziemko, Vivekinan Ashok, and Ebonya Washington analyze American survey data over several decades. Although economic inequality in the U.S. has been increasing since 1970, the study finds that the support for redistribution has remained flat, and has decreased significantly for the elderly and for African-Americans. Possible explanations for this trend are explored, and the authors argue that the elderly have grown less supportive of redistribution due to worries that it would come at their expense through cuts to Medicare. The authors also argue that African-American attitudes surrounding fairness in economic issues have increased, explaining the decline in support for redistribution.

How Elastic Are Preferences for Redistribution? Evidence from Randomized Survey Experiments (2015)

Ilyana Kuziemko, Michael I. Norton, Emmanuel Saez, and Stefanie Stantcheva use randomized online surveys on Amazon Mechanical Turk (mTurk) to analyze the effects of information regarding income inequality and taxes on preferences for redistribution. Randomized treatments were provided to approximately 4,000 respondents with varying information on income inequality in the U.S., the estate tax, and the relationship between tax rates on the highest income group and economic growth. The authors find that the treatment has substantial effects on views about the significance of inequality as a problem. Conversely, the treatment has limited effects on preferences surrounding redistributive policies. Lastly, the authors observe that treatments informing respondents that the estate tax only affects very wealthy families have a large positive effect on support for the estate tax.

Research on the implications of U.S. public health insurance programs on vulnerable groups 
Does Managed Care Widen Infant Health Disparities? Evidence from Texas Medicaid (2017)

In this study, the effects of the transition from fee-for-service (FFS) programs to managed care plans on the disparities in infant health outcomes are analyzed. Ilyana Kuziemko, Katherine Meckel, and Maya Rossin-Slater find that mortality rates and pre-term birth rates increase for black infants, by 15 percent and 7 percent, respectively, and decrease for Hispanic infants by 22 percent and 7 percent, respectively, under private Medicaid Managed Care (MMC) plans.

The Demand for Health Insurance Among Uninsured Americans: Results of a Survey Experiment and Implications for Policy (2013)

To assess the willingness of uninsured Americans to pay for a health insurance plan. Alan B. Krueger and Ilyana Kuziemko conduct a survey experiment on approximately 1,000 individuals through a Gallup-Healthways Daily Poll. The authors observe a higher price elasticity than previously found in other studies. Among the respondents who reported being uninsured, 60 percent would purchase insurance if offered a $2,000 annual premium. Krueger and Kuziemko argue that these results suggest that under the provisions of the Affordable Care Act, an estimate of 29 million uninsured individuals are projected to gain coverage. Furthermore, the authors argue that the results of the study show that the effects of such policies in increasing coverage rates have been greatly underestimates in previous studies.

Research on the U.S. criminal justice system 
How Should Inmates Be Released From Prison? An Assessment of Parole Versus Fixed Sentence Regimes (2013)

To study how parole and fixed sentencing affect recidivism rates, Ilyana Kuziemko analyzes data from the Georgia Department of Corrections over several decades. The study finds that parole boards efficiently set prison time based on a prisoner's recidivism risk, thus reducing recidivism within three years of release by 1.3 percentage points. Furthermore, the findings indicate that the "90% policy" – where prisoners are required to complete at least 90% of their original sentence without the possibility of parole – reduces the inmates' incentives to rehabilitate, resulting in an increase in recidivism rates.

Grants and awards

Notable awards, honours, and fellowships 

 2015: Graduate Economic Council Best Instructor Award, Princeton University
 2015: Quandt Prize, Princeton University
 2014: Sloan Research Fellowship
 2013: Rudolph Schoenheimer Faculty Fund Award, Columbia Business School
 2007: Review of Economic Studies Tour
 2000–2002: Rhodes Scholarship

Publications

Academic publications 

 Kuziemko, Ilyana, and Ebonya Washington. "Why did the Democrats Lose the South? Bringing New Data to an Old Debate." American Economic Review 108, no. 10 (2018): 2830–67.
Kuziemko, Ilyana, Jessica Pan, Jenny Shen, and Ebonya Washington. "The Mommy Effect: Do Women Anticipate the Employment Effects of Motherhood?" (2018)
Kuziemko, Ilyana, Katherine Meckel, and Maya Rossin-Slater. "Does Managed Care Widen Infant Health Disparities? Evidence from Texas Medicaid." (2017)
Charité, Jimmy. Raymond Fisman, and Ilyana Kuziemko. "Reference points and redistributive preferences: Experimental evidence." National Bureau of Economic Research (2015)
Ashok, Vivekinan, Ilyana Kuziemko, and Ebonya Washington. "Support for redistribution in an age of rising inequality: New stylized facts and some tentative explanations." Brookings Papers on Economic Activity 2015, no. 1 (2016): 367–433.
Kuziemko, Ilyana, Michael I. Norton, Emmanuel Saez, Stefanie Stantcheva. "How Elastic Are Preferences for Redistribution? Evidence from Randomized Survey Experiments." American Economic Review 105, no. 4 (2015): 1478–1508.
Brown, Jason, Mark Duggan, Ilyana Kuziemko, and William Woolston. "How does Risk Selection Respond to Risk Adjustment? Evidence form the Medicare Advantage Program." American Economic Review 104, no. 10 (2014): 3335–64.
Kuziemko, Ilyana. "Human Capital Spillovers in Families: Do Parents Learn from or Lean on their Children?" Journal of Labor Economics 32, no. 4 (2014): 755–786.
Kuziemko, Ilyana, and Joseph Ferrie. "The Role of Immigrant Children in Their Parents' Assimilation in the United States, 1850–2010." in Human Capital in History: The American Record edited by Leah P. Boustan, Carola Frydman, and Robert A. Margo, (2014): 97–120.
Kuziemko, Ilyana, Ryan W. Buell, Taly Reich, and Michael I. Norton. "'Last-place Aversion': Evidence and Redistributive Implications." Quarterly Journal of Economics 129, no. 1 (2014): 105–149.
Krueger, Alan B. and Ilyana Kuziemko. "The demand for health insurance among uninsured Americans: Results of a survey experiment and implications for policy." Journal of Health Economics 32, no. 5 (2013): 780–793.
Kuziemko, Ilyana. "How Should Inmates Be Released From Prison? An Assessment of Parole Versus Fixed Sentence Regimes." Quarterly Journal of Economics 128, no. 1 (2013): 371–424.
Jayachandran, Seema and Ilyana Kuziemko. "Why Do Mothers Breastfeed Girls Less Than Boys? Evidence and Implications for Child Health in India." Quarterly Journal of Economics 126, no. 3 (2011): 1485–1538.
Kuziemko, Ilyana and Eric Werker. "How Much Is a Seat on the Security Council Worth? Foreign Aid and Bribery at the United Nations." Journal of Political Economy 20, no. 4 (2006): 133–156.
Goldin, Claudia, Lawrence F. Katz, and Ilyana Kuziemko. "The Homecoming of American College Women: The Reversal of the College Gender Gap." Journal of Economic Perspectives 20, no. 4 (2006): 133–156.
Kuziemko, Ilyana. "Does the Threat of the Death Penalty Affect Plea Bargaining in Murder Cases? Evidence from New York's 1995 Reinstatement of Capital Punishment." American Law and Economic Review 8, no. 1 (2006): 116–142.
Kuziemko, Ilyana. "Using Shocks to School Enrollment to Estimate the Effect of School Size on Student Achievement." Economics of Education Review 25, no. 1 (2006): 63–75.
Kuziemko, Ilyana and Steven D. Levitt. "An empirical analysis of imprisoning drug offenders." Journal of Public Economics 88, no. 9 (2004): 2043–2066.

References 

American economists
Princeton University faculty
Harvard University alumni
Year of birth missing (living people)
Living people
American women economists
21st-century American women
Columbia Business School faculty